John DeLuca is an American actor and singer who is known for his role as Butchy in the Disney Channel Original Movie, Teen Beach Movie, as well as its sequel Teen Beach 2, and as Anthony in coming-of-age comedy Staten Island Summer. He also guest starred with Maia Mitchell on an episode of Disney Channel's show, Jessie, along with a guest appearance on Wizards of Waverly Place.

Early life 
DeLuca was born in Longmeadow, Massachusetts, the eldest of 3 boys. Growing up, DeLuca was an athlete. In his senior year of high school, DeLuca decided to try out for high school production of The Wizard of Oz, where he auditioned for the role of Scarecrow. After he got the part, he decided to pursue acting. He graduated from Longmeadow High School. DeLuca is a graduate of Fordham University in New York where he was a Theatre major.

Career 
In 2009, DeLuca had his acting and TV debut, when he guest starred in shows Ugly Betty and 30 Rock. In 2011, he guest starred in TV shows Lights Out and Wizards of Waverly Place. That same year he also starred as Bucky Buchanan in Disney Channel unsold pilot Zombies and Cheerleaders. In early 2012, DeLuca guest starred in an episode of The Secret Life of the American Teenager.

In 2012, DeLuca had a film debut in We Made This Movie, where he played the role of Jeff. Later, he guest-starred in an episode of Sketchy. In December 2012, he had a role as Colin Hemingway in the indie drama movie Hemingway.  In early 2013, DeLuca guest starred with Maia Mitchell on Disney show Jessie. In 2013, he landed the role of Butchy in a hit Disney Channel Original Movie, Teen Beach Movie. The movie was directed by Jeffrey Hornaday and earned 13.5 million total viewers on Disney Channel. He played the role of Butchy, the leader of the biker gang in the movie within the movie. Also in 2013, DeLuca had a recurring role in the TV series Twisted, as Cole Farell. He had a role in short film It Remains.

In 2014, he guest starred on an episode of Instant Mom. In 2015, DeLuca reprised his role as Butchy, leader of the biker gang, in the Disney Channel Original Movie, Teen Beach 2 sequel to the hit movie Teen Beach Movie. The film was directed by Jeffrey Hornaday and premiered to 7.5 million total viewers on Disney Channel. He had a main role in coming-of-age comedy Staten Island Summer as Anthony DiBuono, Italian lifeguard who dreams of joining the Navy. The film was directed by Rhys Thomas and written by Colin Jost and had a limited release in theater before premiering worldwide on Netflix on July 30, 2015.

On April 4, 2016, it was announced that DeLuca had joined the cast of ABC's soap opera, General Hospital. His character, Aaron Roland, started recurring on April 27, 2016. DeLuca guest starred in multiple season 4 episodes as Jeremy in Hulu's drama East Los High. He played the role of Brett in web released short films Free Period. The short films were released on Disney Channel's YouTube page.

He starred as Chet in the family friendly gymnastic movie Chalk It Up alongside Maddy Curley and Nikki SooHoo. The movie was released on September 13, 2016 on iTunes, Amazon and Google Play. He also starred as Wade in the family friendly movie All Halloes' Eve co-starring Lexi Giovagnoli and Ashley Argota. The movie was released on digital hd on September 27, 2016. On October 6, 2016 DeLuca guest starred in an episode of How to Get Away with Murder. He also guest starred in an episode of Comrade Detective, where he voiced the character Young Nikita.

In 2017, he starred as Maverick in the short film Lara Croft Is My Girlfriend alongside his then girlfriend Lidia Rivera. Later that year, he also appeared as Bobby in the Go90's romantic comedy series Relationship Status. DeLuca guest starred as Billy in the horror web series Welcome To Daisyland. He also guest starred as Rod in an episode of FX's American Horror Story: 1984. DeLuca had a supporting role as Davey Wallace in Hallmark Channel Original Movie A Merry Christmas Match opposite Lindsey Gort. He guest starred as Vinny Linguini (voice) in Disney's Muppet Babies.

In 2020, DeLuca played the supporting role of Mario in the independent thriller Spree, which had its world premiere on January 24, 2020 at Sundance Film Festival. He starred as Josh Grant in the Lifetime original movie Killer Dream Home alongside Maiara Walsh. In 2021, he played the role of Bobby in the comedy film Donny's Bar Mitzvah.

Filmography

Film

Television

Video games

Awards and nominations

Discography

Soundtrack albums

References

External links 

 
 
 

Living people
American male film actors
American male television actors
People from Longmeadow, Massachusetts
Fordham University alumni
Year of birth missing (living people)